Arthur Migliazza (born 1980) is an American blues and boogie woogie pianist.

Early life and education 
Arthur Migliazza began studying classical piano at age nine in Washington, D.C., but soon switched to playing blues at age 10 when exposed to it by his teacher. At age eleven Migliazza moved to Tucson, AZ with his family and played his first professional show at age 13 at the Tucson Blues Festival, opening for Little Milton.

Migliazza's most notable teachers growing up were Judy Luis-Watson, Ann Rabson, Mark Braun and Henry Butler. Many of his interactions with these teachers were not on a regular basis, but rather by correspondence. From 1991 to 2001 Migliazza also attended Augusta Blues Week in Elkins, WV for one week every summer. It was there that he befriended and learned from other blues greats such as Cephas and Wiggins, John Jackson, Steve James, Del Rey, and Saffire - The Uppidy Blues Women.

Throughout junior high and high school, Migliazza worked as a solo musician and as part of a piano and drums duo called The Blues Kats, mostly performing at Tucson social events and retirement homes. In 1996 the duo released its first and only album, Funja,  and in 1997 the duo was a runner-up in the Tucson Area Music Awards for best blues act.

After graduating, Migliazza moved to Hiroshima, Japan to teach English for a year under the JET Programme.

Teaching 
Arthur Migliazza began teaching private piano lessons at age 15 and has also appeared on the faculty at Augusta Blues Week in Elkins, WV and Centrum Blues Week in Port Townsend, WA many times since 2001. In 2015 Hal Leonard published Migliazza's signature "8-Lick" teaching method in a book called How to Play Boogie Woogie Piano. The success of this book prompted Migliazza to author an article for wikihow also called How To Play Boogie Woogie Piano and start the first online school for boogie woogie piano instruction called School of Boogie.

Solo performances and bands 
Arthur Migliazza is most known for his solo performances, which blend virtuoso piano playing with historic storytelling and anecdotes. He continues to perform around the US and internationally as a solo act.

His first band was the Blues Kats, formed in 1994 in Tucson, AZ with drummer Joe Martinez and they released an album in 1997 called Funja.

In 2011, Migliazza teamed up with former Chuck Berry piano player Bob Baldori to perform Baldori's original stage play about the history of Boogie Woogie music called Boogie Stomp!, eventually releasing an album together entitled Disturbing the Peace in 2018 under the name The Boogie Kings. The duo enjoyed many US and international tours, including two sold-out tours of Russia on behalf of the US Embassy, and two extended Off-Broadway runs in NYC, in 2014 and 2015.

While living in Seattle in 2013, Migliazza performed heavily with the Rockabilly group The Dusty 45s.

In 2016, an unpublished original work of Migliazza called Gimme Attention was adapted to the J-Pop style by Japanese pop star Kazumi Morohoshi and released as a signal. Migliazza performed with Morohoshi on stage at Zepp Tokyo for Morohoshi's birthday concert and release of the single.

Awards 
 Best Keyboardist in Tucson, AZ (TAMMY Award) - 2005
 Arizona Blues Hall of Fame - 2010
 Finalist - International Blues Challenge in Memphis, TN (The Blues Foundation) - 2010
 Best Keyboardist in Washington State (South Sound Best of the Blues Awards) - 2014 
 Finalist - International Blues Challenge in Memphis, TN (The Blues Foundation) - 2014
 Best Self Produced CD - Laying it Down (South Sound Blues Society) - 2014

Discography 
 Funja (The Blues Kats) - 1996
 Arthur Migliazza - 2004
 Pumping Ivories - 2006
 Positively 17th Street (17th Street Band) - 2009
 Burn Your Bridges (with Tom Walbank) - 2009
 Laying it Down - 2014
 Bumble Boogie - 2017
 Gimme Attention (Kazumi Morohoshi) - 2016
 Disturbing the Peace (Boogie Kings) - 2018

References

External links 
Official site

American male pianists
Living people
1980 births
20th-century American pianists
20th-century American male musicians
21st-century American pianists
21st-century American male musicians
People from Hyattsville, Maryland
Musicians from Maryland
Musicians from Tucson, Arizona
American blues pianists
Boogie-woogie pianists
University of Arizona alumni